Anthony Eisen is an Australian FinTech entrepreneur and is the co-founder of Afterpay.

Eisen attended Sydney Grammar School and graduated from the University of New South Wales with a Bachelor of Commerce. He initially began working as a chartered accountant before moving into investment banking, specialising in mergers and acquisitions.

In August 2021, Afterpay was acquired by Square Inc. (later renamed Block, Inc. in December 2021) for 29 billion. It was reported that Eisen and Molnar will receive 2.7 billion in Square stock for their Afterpay shares and, post-settlement, they will jointly lead Afterpay’s merchant and consumer businesses inside Square.

His net worth was 1.8 billion.

References

Living people
Australian chief executives
1972 births
University of New South Wales alumni
People educated at Sydney Grammar School
Australian company founders
Australian billionaires
Block, Inc. employees